Diocaesarea or Diocaesareia or Diokaisareia was a Graeco-Roman town located in ancient Cappadocia near Nazianzus. According to Gregorius of Nazianzus, it was a small place. It is mentioned by Ptolemy and by Pliny the Elder.

Its site is located near Til (formerly Kaysar, reflecting the old name) in Asiatic Turkey.

References

Populated places in ancient Cappadocia
Former populated places in Turkey
History of Nevşehir Province